Pranalinga {Kannada:ಪ್ರಾಣಲಿಂಗ} within Hinduism refers to the experience of all as a form of god. It is a concept in Lingayatism.

See also 
List of Lingayats

References 

Lingayatism